Țifești is a commune located in Vrancea County, Western Moldavia, Romania. It is composed of eight villages: Bătinești, Clipicești, Igești, Oleșești, Pătrășcani, Sârbi, Țifești and Vitănești.

References

Communes in Vrancea County
Localities in Western Moldavia